Traktarny zavod (lit: "Tractor Factory") is a Minsk Metro station. It opened on 31 December 1990.

Gallery 

Minsk Metro stations
Railway stations opened in 1990
1990 establishments in Belarus